Andrea Moraes  (born ) is a Brazilian female volleyball player. She was part of the Brazil women's national volleyball team.

She participated in the 1994 FIVB Volleyball Women's World Championship. On club level she played with Rio Fone.

Clubs
 Rio Fone (1994)

References

1969 births
Living people
Brazilian women's volleyball players
Place of birth missing (living people)
Sportspeople from São Paulo